Nadjib Baouia (born 25 February 1992) is an Algerian footballer who plays as a forward for French club Créteil.

Club career
Born in El M'Ghair, Algeria, Baouia joined the youth ranks of Evian in 2011 from Caluire SC. In March 2013, he made his senior league debut as a substitute against Reims in the 30th round of the 2012–13 Ligue 1 season, playing seven minutes. In May, in his second senior appearance he scored his first senior goal in the semi-final of the 2012–13 Coupe de France in the 4–0 win over Lorient. Baouia scored the fourth goal of the game after having made his appearance on the field two minutes prior.

In August 2015, after a successful trial, Baouia signed his first professional contract, a one-year Deal, with a further one-year option, with Ligue 2 RC Lens. After many games with the reserve team in Championnat de France Amateur he made his debut, and only appearance, for the first team as a substitute in the 0–1 defeat by AJ Auxerre on 15 April 2017.

In June 2017, Baouia joined newly promoted Championnat National team SO Cholet.

In January 2020, Baouia joined fellow Championnat National side AS Lyon Duchère (who rebranded as Sporting Club Lyon in June 2020) on a one-and-a-half-year deal.

In June 2021, he moved to Sète, also in Championnat National.

On 13 July 2022, Baouia joined Créteil in Championnat National 2.

References

External links
 
 

Living people
1992 births
People from El Oued Province
Algerian footballers
Algerian expatriate footballers
Expatriate footballers in France
Algerian expatriate sportspeople in France
Ligue 1 players
Championnat National players
Thonon Evian Grand Genève F.C. players
RC Lens players
SO Cholet players
Lyon La Duchère players
FC Sète 34 players
US Créteil-Lusitanos players
Association football forwards
21st-century Algerian people